Diplodon expansus is a species of freshwater mussel in the family Hyriidae. It is endemic to Brazil.

References

Hyriidae
Endemic fauna of Brazil
Bivalves described in 1856
Taxonomy articles created by Polbot